My Fair Lady is a 2015 Philippine romantic comedy television series starring Jasmine Curtis-Smith, Vin Abrenica and Luis Alandy. It premiered on TV5 on September 14, 2015 and also aired worldwide via Kapatid TV5 replacing Baker King.

It is a remake of the 2009 South Korean television series of the same name originally played by Yoon Eun-hye, Yoon Sang-hyun, Jung Il-woo and Moon Chae-won.

Cast

Main cast
 Jasmine Curtis-Smith as Audrey Tiuseco
 Vin Abrenica as Hero Del Rosario
 Luis Alandy as Benjie

Supporting cast
 Katrina Legaspi as Vanessa
 Chanel Morales as Nikki
 Yayo Aguila as Aling Susan
 Marjorie Barretto as Viveka
 DJ Durano as Marcelo
 Jenny Miller as Martha
 Joross Gamboa as Sir Arthur
 Eddie Gutierrez as Lolo Matteo
 Alwyn Uytingco as Narrator
 Marilyn Villamayor as Violy

See also
 List of programs broadcast by TV5
 My Fair Lady (KBS)

References

External links
 

TV5 (Philippine TV network) drama series
Philippine drama television series
Philippine romantic comedy television series
2015 Philippine television series debuts
2015 Philippine television series endings
Philippine television series based on South Korean television series
Filipino-language television shows